Alto High School (AHS) is a public high school in Alto, Texas. It is part of the Alto Independent School District which is located in south central Cherokee County and classified as a 2A school by the UIL. In 2015, the school was rated "Met Standard" by the Texas Education Agency.

Campus
Serving students in grades 9-12, Alto High School is a small community-based school.

In 2013, U.S. News & World Report awarded its bronze medal to the school based on its performance on state exit exams. As of 2015, the school had 194 students and 20 faculty members.

Athletics
The Alto Yellow Jackets compete in the following sports:

Baseball
Basketball
Cross Country
Football
Golf
Softball
Tennis
Track and Field

Football
The football team has an all-time record of 482 wins, 290 losses and 31 ties as of the end of the 2013 season.

State Titles
Football - 
2006(1A/D1), 2007(1A/D2)
Softball - 
1999(2A)
Boys Track - 
1984(2), 1986(2A), 1996(2A), 2004(2A), 2014(1A/D1)
Girls Track - 
1996(2A), 2003(2A), 2005(2A)

State Finalist
Baseball - 
1999(2A)
Football - 
1995(2A)
Softball - 
2000(2A), 2002(2A), 2009(1A)

Alto "Mean Sting Marching Machine" Band 
The Alto ISD "Mean Sting Marching Machine" (#MSMM) Band is a composite band incorporating students from 7th through 12th grade. The director of Bands in Alto ISD is Mr. Timothy Ektefaei who began fall of 2014. Mr. Ektefaei is a graduate of Stephen F. Austin State University (M.M.ed) and Prairie View A&M University (BA). Under his leadership the band has grown from 25 members to over 100 participants for the 2017-2018 school year. This is recorded as the largest marching band in the history of the school. The band's notoriety and popularity have grown due to their success from competing with bands from across Texas, Louisiana, and Mississippi. The band has won numerous awards, having placed in every competition they have entered from 2014–present, including several Grand Champion Awards. The Alto Band has performed in front of an international television audience at the Circuit of The America's (COTA) Raceway in Austin, Texas as a part of the opening ceremony for the FIA World Endurance Championship race. The Mean Sting Band was recognized in the Spring semester of 2018 by Texas State Senator Robert Nichols for the band's outstanding performance in the 2018 San Antonio Battle of Flowers Parade, winning first place in the "Out of Town Bands" division. Senator Nichols presented the band with a flag that was flown over the Texas State Capitol building in their honor.

References

External links
 Alto ISD website

Schools in Cherokee County, Texas
Public high schools in Texas